C. imbricata may refer to:
 Clarkia imbricata, the Vine Hill clarkia, a rare flowering plant species endemic to Sonoma County, California
 Cyathea imbricata, a tree fern species endemic to western New Guinea
 Cylindropuntia imbricata, the cane cholla, walking stick cholla, tree cholla or chainlink cactus,  a cactus species found in arid parts of North America
 Concavodonta imbricata, an Ordovician age bivalve from Northern Ireland

Synonyms
 Candollea imbricata, a synonym for Stylidium imbricatum, a plant species

See also
 Imbricata